Andrea Pagoto (born 11 July 1985 in Montecchio Emilia) is an Italian cyclist. He rode in the 2007 Giro d'Italia.

Palmares
2005
1st Milano-Busseto
2006
10th Giro di Lombardia
2008
8th Giro d'Oro

References

1985 births
Living people
Italian male cyclists
Sportspeople from Reggio Emilia